Mart is a masculine given name in Dutch, Estonian and less often in English.

People named Mart include:
Mart Bax (born 1937), Dutch anthropologist
Mart Bras (born 1950), Dutch water polo player
Mart Crowley (born 1935), American playwright
Mart Dijkstra (born 1990), Dutch footballer
Mart Duggan (1848–1888), American gunfighter and lawman
Mart Green, American businessman
Mart Helme (born 1949), Estonian historian, journalist, diplomat and politician
Mart Järvik (born 1956), Estonian politician
Mart Jüssi (born 1965), Estonian ecologist and politician
Mart Juur (born 1964), Estonian writer, humorist, journalist, music critic, editor and television presenter
Mart Kadastik (born 1955), Estonian journalist
Mart Kampus (born 1961), Estonian actor and theatre director
Mart Kangur (born 1971), Estonian poet, translator and philosopher
Mart Kenney (1910–2006), Canadian jazz musician
Mart Kuusik (1877–1965), Estonian rower
Mart Laar (born 1960), Estonian politician and historian
Mart Laga (1936–1977), Estonian basketball player
Mart Lieder (born 1990), Dutch footballer
Mart Markus (born 1990), Estonian speed skater and coach
Mart McChesney (1954–1999), American actor
Mart Murdvee (born 1951), Estonian psychologist and scholar
Mart Müürisepp (born 1991), Estonian actor
Mart Nooij (born 1954), Dutch football manager
Mart Nutt (born 1962), Estonian politician and historian
Mart Ojavee (born 1981), Estonian cyclist
Mart Opmann (born 1956), Estonian politician
Mart Paama (1938–2006), Estonian track and field athlete 
Mart Poom (born 1972), Estonian football goalkeeper
Mart Port (1922–2012), Estonian architect
Mart Raud (1903–1980), Estonian poet, playwright and writer
Mart Saar (1882–1963), Estonian composer
Mart Saarma (born 1949),  Estonian molecular biologist
Mart Sander (born 1967), Estonian singer, actor, director, author and television host
Mart Seim (born 1990), Estonian weightlifter 
Mart Siimann (born 1946), Estonian politician
Mart Siliksaar (born 1949), Estonian badminton player and coach
Mart Smeets (born 1947), Dutch journalist
Mart Stam (1899–1986), Dutch architect and furniture designer
Mart Taniel (born 1976), Estonian film director, cinematographer and film operator
Mart Toome (born 1980), Estonian actor 
Mart Ummelas (born 1953), Estonian journalist
Mart Ustav (born 1949), Estonian biomedical scientist
Mart Vilt (1935–2021), Estonian middle-distance runner

See also
Mart (disambiguation)
Märt

References

Dutch masculine given names
Estonian masculine given names